Francisco Javier Plascencia Alonso (born 10 January 1956) is a Mexican politician affiliated with the National Action Party. As of 2014 he served as Deputy of the LX Legislature of the Mexican Congress representing Jalisco.

References

1956 births
Living people
Politicians from Jalisco
National Action Party (Mexico) politicians
21st-century Mexican politicians
Deputies of the LX Legislature of Mexico
Members of the Chamber of Deputies (Mexico) for Jalisco